"Maybe California" is a song by American singer and songwriter Tori Amos from her tenth studio album  Abnormally Attracted to Sin (2009). It was released as a promotional single May 19, 2009 by Universal Republic as a digital download only.

Background and release

The song is a sparse ballad production featuring piano and vocals by Amos with light percussion and lush string arrangements. Thematically, the lyrics deals with a mother who has fallen into despair over the inability to care for her family's needs, and is contemplating suicide as a way out. Amos observed that women often quietly shoulder the burden of keeping a family intact, especially in times of emotional and financial strain, stating that Maybe California comes out of that kind of crisis:

Amos made the song, its video and ringtone available to download for free on Mother's Day as a gift, so that mothers everywhere could "know that they are seen and appreciated".

A new version of Maybe California was recorded with a full orchestra as an iTunes bonus track for inclusion on Amos' 2012 retrospective release Gold Dust.

Music video
As with all the tracks on Abnormally Attracted to Sin, Maybe California has an accompanying "visualette" composed of material filmed during Amos' previous tour supporting American Doll Posse. The video clip features Amos driving a car and pensively moving around a park, sidewalks, along the seaside and cliffs while wearing Haute couture clothes. The video culminates in Amos standing on the edge of a cliff and reaching out her arms, as if to give a hand.

The music video was included on a DVD accompanying the deluxe edition of the album.

Reception

The song was met with positive reviews by critics, who found the simple production and confessional content to be an enjoyable and touching return to the style of Amos' earlier recordings. Rolling Stone named Maybe California the standout track on the album. PopMatters also said the song was a highlight, stating that "Perhaps most satisfying of all of it is the realization that [it] is as wrenching a song as she’s ever written, so quiet in its despair, but so clear at the same time". BBC Music's review likewise stated that the simple ballad was archetypal Amos. All Music Guide's review finds it to be "beautifully composed and delivered". Slant Magazine's review called the song "a frankly stunning plea". The reviewer for Wears The Trousers felt the song has "some genuinely touching moments but lyrically is perhaps too direct". SPIN magazine, while negative in their review of the album, singled out Maybe California as the track to download.

Charts and certifications
Although it did not chart anywhere else, Maybe California reached #1 in Portugal.

References

External links
 
 Tori Amos' website

Tori Amos songs
2009 singles
Rock ballads
Songs written by Tori Amos
2009 songs
Universal Republic Records singles
Songs about suicide